Albert IV (or Albert the Wise) (c. 1188 – December 13, 1239) was Count of Habsburg in the Aargau and a progenitor of the royal House of Habsburg.

He was the son of Count Rudolph II of Habsburg and Agnes of Staufen. About 1217, Albert married Hedwig (Heilwig), daughter of Count Ulrich of Kyburg (died 1237) and Anna of Zähringen. He was present at the signing of the Golden Bull of Rimini in March 1226. Upon the death of his father in 1232, he divided his family's estates with his brother Rudolph III, whereby he retained the ancestral seat at Habsburg Castle. A follower of Emperor Frederick II of Hohenstaufen, he took part in the Barons' Crusade of 1239 with King Theobald I of Navarre and died near Ashkelon.

Albert was the father of King Rudolf I of Germany.

References

Sources

External links
Britannica article

Counts of Habsburg
Christians of the Barons' Crusade
1180s births
1239 deaths
Year of birth uncertain